Han Jong-chol (born September 13, 1982) is a North Korean figure skater. He is the 2001 North Korean national bronze medalist.

External links
 

1982 births
North Korean male single skaters
Living people
Sportspeople from Pyongyang